The Naturgas Open was a golf tournament on the Swedish Golf Tour from 1986 to 1989. It was always played in Lund, Sweden.

Winners

References

Swedish Golf Tour events
Golf tournaments in Sweden
Recurring sporting events established in 1986
Recurring sporting events disestablished in 1989
1986 establishments in Sweden
1989 disestablishments in Sweden